The O'Brien General Store and Post Office is a combined store and post office located at Schatzell and Charles streets in the hamlet of Rhinecliff, New York, United States, across from the community's central plaza. It is a two-building Italianate complex built in the late 19th century. The western half houses the store and the eastern the post office, which serves the small 12574 ZIP Code roughly contiguous with the riverside hamlet.

It is a contributing property to the Hudson River Historic District, a National Historic Landmark which includes all of the hamlet. The building itself was added to the National Register of Historic Places in 1987.

References

Post office buildings on the National Register of Historic Places in New York (state)
Commercial buildings on the National Register of Historic Places in New York (state)
Italianate architecture in New York (state)
Buildings and structures in Rhinebeck, New York
Individually listed contributing properties to historic districts on the National Register in New York (state)
National Register of Historic Places in Dutchess County, New York